The Northern Development, Mines, Natural Resources and Forestry is a government ministry of the Canadian province of Ontario that is responsible for Ontario's provincial parks, forests, fisheries, wildlife, mineral aggregates and the Crown lands and waters that make up 87 per cent of the province. Its offices are divided into Northwestern, Northeastern and Southern Ontario regions with the main headquarters in Peterborough, Ontario. The current minister is Greg Rickford.

In 2021, the Ministry of Natural Resources and Forestry again merged with the Ministry of Energy, Northern Development and Mines to form the Ministry of Northern Development, Mines, Natural Resources and Forestry, while the Ministry of Energy became a separate ministry.

History
The first government office charge with responsibility of crown land management in modern-day Ontario was the Office of the Surveyor-General of the Northern District of North America, created in 1763 and initially headed by Samuel Holland. Holland was initially appointed Surveyor General of Quebec, but offered to assume the larger responsibility at no increase in salary. In 1791, Upper and Lower Canada were created via the Constitutional Act 1791. Holland continued to serve as Surveyor General for both, but openly advocated that they should be separate posts.

In 1792, David William Smith was named by Lieutenant Governor John Graves Simcoe to be acting Surveyor General of Upper Canada (against Holland's advice to appoint William Chewett as his replacement), Smith and was subsequently officially appointed to the position in 1798 and held the office until his resignation in 1804. The previously overlooked Chewett and Thomas Ridout were appointed to the position jointly in the interim. In 1805, Charles Burton Wyatt was appointed (along with Joseph Bouchette) but was suspended in 1807. Ridout was named to the office in 1807 and held the position until 1829.

The Office of the Commissioner of Crown Lands for Upper Canada was established in 1827. By the 1840s, however, the crown lands department had been established over which the Commissioner presided, and by 1860, this was renamed the Department of Crown Lands. The primary responsibility of the department was the sale and management of public lands and the granting of land to settlers. Between 1827 and 1867, the responsibilities of the department expanded to include the duties of the Surveyor General (in 1845), as well as those of the Surveyor General of Woods and Forests (in 1852). By 1867, the Department had responsibility over mines, fisheries, ordnance lands, colonization roads, and Indian affairs, as well.

In 1867, the Department of Crown Lands for the Province of Canada was replaced with the Department of Crown Lands for Ontario. Ordnance lands, Indian affairs and fisheries were, however, transferred to the federal government in 1867. In 1900, the department also acquired responsibility over immigration and colonization.

In 1905, legislation was passed which renamed the Commissioner of Crown Lands to the Minister of Lands and Mines. With this change, the department was renamed the Department of Lands and Mines. At this time, responsibilities for forestry were transferred to the Department of Agriculture. In 1906, the department was renamed the Department of Lands, Forests and Mines, resuming responsibilities for forestry. It also resumed responsibilities for immigration and colonization between 1916 and 1920.

In 1920, the department was renamed Department of Lands and Forests when a separate Department of Mines was established. Responsibilities for immigration and colonization were also transferred back to the Department of Agriculture.

The department existed until 1972, when it amalgamated with the Department of Mines and Northern Affairs to form the Ministry of Natural Resources. The ministry was responsible for northern affairs until 1977, and for mines until 1985. It was again merged briefly between 1995 and 1997 with Northern Development and Mines to form a single Ministry of Natural Resources, Northern Development and Mines.
 
In 2014 the ministry was renamed the Ministry of Natural Resources and Forestry, but responsibilities did not change.

In June 2021, the Ministry of Natural Resources and Forestry once again merged with the Ministry of Northern Development and Mines to form the Ministry of Northern Development, Mines, Natural Resources and Forestry.

After the 2022 Ontario General Election in which the incumbent Progressive Conservatives were re-elected, the Ministry was once again separated, this time into 3 independent ministries; the Ministry of Natural Resources and Forestry, the Ministry of Northern Development and the Ministry of Mines.

List of Ministers (Commissioners prior to 1905)

Organization
MNRF is organized into divisions; within each division are branches/regions, sections, and units.
Divisions
Regional Operations Division
Provincial Services Division
Policy Division
Corporate Management and Information Division

Responsibilities

The Ministry is responsible for:

Fish & Wildlife Management – sustainably managing Ontario's fish and wildlife resources.
Land & Waters Management – leading the management of Ontario's Crown lands, water, oil, gas, salt and aggregates resources, including making Crown land available for renewable energy projects.
Forest Management – ensuring the sustainable management of Ontario's Crown forests.
Ontario Parks – guiding the management of Ontario's parks and protected areas.
Forest Fire, Flood and Drought Protection - protecting people, property and communities from related emergencies.
Geographic Information – developing and applying geographic information to help manage the province's natural resources.

The ministry also has responsibility for the Office of the Mining & Lands Commissioner and the Niagara Escarpment Commission agencies.

Ontario Parks
Ontario Parks protects significant natural and cultural resources in a system of parks and protected areas.

Aviation, Forest Fire and Emergency Services
The Ministry's Aviation, Forest Fire and Emergency Services (AFFES) program coordinates forest fire detection, monitoring, suppression and public information and education services for Ontario.  AFFES also provides aviation services for the Ontario government and leads emergency management planning and response for natural hazards such as forest fires, floods, erosion, dam failures, unstable soils and bedrock, droughts and oil and gas emergencies.

The Ministry's entrance into the field of aviation started with hiring Laurentide Air Services to carry out fire patrols however the government soon realized it could save money by carrying out the operations itself and formed the Ontario Provincial Air Service, (O.P.A.S.) in February 1924 with 13 second hand Curtiss HS-2L flying boats that had been originally built for the US Navy. The OPAS was an early pioneer in the use of aircraft for the discovery and extinguishing of forest fires. Initially this involved carrying warnings of fires back to existing fire patrols, to be extinguished by teams that travelled by canoe or overland but soon they began landing firefighters (never more than a few at a time due to the limited carrying capacity of the aircraft available) with a hand-operated water pump near a fire. As a part of this program the OPAS completely rebuilt damaged aircraft before they began building a number of aircraft under license to meet their requirements such as the Buhl Air Sedan, and later provided considerable input on the development of the de Havilland Canada DHC-2 Beaver and de Havilland Canada DHC-3 Otter and finally were central to  the invention of the water bomber. The first water bomber was an OPAS DHC Beaver with a tank mounted on the float designed to dump the water out quickly. This had followed unsuccessful experiments with bags of water.

Current AFFES Airfleet
 9 Bombardier Canadair CL-415 - firefighting
 3 Bell 206 L-1 Long Ranger II
 1 Eurocopter 350-B2s
 2 Beechcraft King Air 300
 7 Eurocopter EC 130 B4
 6 de Havilland Canada DHC-6 Twin Otters - firefighting
 5 de Havilland Canada DHC-2 Mk III Turbo Beavers - firefighting

Retired

 4 Buhl CA-6 Air Sedans
 2 Canadian Vickers Vedette Flying Boats
 14 Curtiss HS-2L Flying Boats
 de Havilland Canada DHC-2 Beaver
 de Havilland Canada DHC-3 Otter
 de Havilland Dove Twin Engine Monoplane
 de Havilland Fox Moth Cabin Biplane
 2 de Havilland Giant Moth Cabin Biplane
 17 de Havilland Moth (includes DH.60G Gypsy Moth, DH.60M Moth & DH.60X Moth)
 4 Fairchild 71 cabin monoplanes
 Fairchild KR-34 (Open cockpit biplane permanently assigned to the Superintendent)
 Grumman CS2F-1 Tracker - firefighting
 4 Hamilton Metalplane cabin monoplanes
 1 MBB/Kawasaki BK 117 twin engine helicopter
 10+ Stinson Reliant Cabin monoplane
 Waco ZQC-6 Cabin Biplane

Aircraft on display
 Former MNR de Havilland Beaver, C-FOBS, serial number 2, the first production Beaver manufactured by de Havilland Canada, is on display at the Canadian Bushplane Heritage Centre, Sault Ste Marie, Ontario

OMNR Image Gallery

See also
Canadian Bushplane Heritage Centre (CBHC)
Ontario Forest Research Institute (OFRI)

References

External links

 

Natural Resources
Ontario
Aerial firefighting
Ontario
Ontario, Natural Resources and Forestry
Peterborough, Ontario
1972 establishments in Ontario
Ontario
Forestry agencies in Canada
Ontario